Tim Veldt (born 14 February 1984) is a Dutch former track cyclist, who currently works as a directeur sportif for both the road and track teams of . During his career Veldt won two world cup classics in the team sprint, two European titles (under 23 1 km time trial and omnium) as well as three Dutch national titles (1 km time trial twice and keirin). During the 2005 UCI Track Cycling World Championships he won the silver medal in the team sprint together with Theo Bos and Teun Mulder.

In this team the riders are Matthijs Büchli, Theo Bos and Roy van den Berg.

Major results

2003
 National Track Championships
2nd Kilo
3rd Sprint
2004
 1st Team sprint, 2004–05 UCI Track Cycling World Cup Classics, Los Angeles
 National Track Championships
2nd Kilo
3rd Keirin
3rd Sprint
2005
 National Track Championships
1st  Kilo
1st  Keirin
2nd Sprint
 2nd Team sprint, UCI Track World Championships
 2nd Kilo, 2004–05 UCI Track Cycling World Cup Classics, Sydney
 2005–06 UCI Track Cycling World Cup Classics, Manchester
2nd Team sprint
3rd Kilo
 3rd Kilo, UEC European Under-23 Track Championships
2006
 1st  Omnium, UEC European Track Championships
 1st  Kilo, UEC European Under-23 Track Championships
 2005–06 UCI Track Cycling World Cup Classics
1st Team sprint, Moscow
2nd Kilo, Los Angeles
 2006–07 UCI Track Cycling World Cup Classics
2nd Team sprint, Sydney
2nd Team sprint, Moscow
3rd Kilo, Sydney
 National Track Championships
1st  Kilo
3rd Sprint
2007
 National Track Championships
1st  Kilo
1st  Sprint
3rd Keirin
 2nd Rotterdam Sprint Cup
 3rd Kilo, 2006–07 UCI Track Cycling World Cup Classics, Manchester
2008
 National Track Championships
3rd Kilo
3rd Scratch
2009
 National Track Championships
2nd Kilo
3rd Individual pursuit
2010
 National Track Championships
1st  Kilo
2nd Individual pursuit
2011
 National Track Championships
1st  Scratch
2nd Points race
2012
 National Track Championships
1st  Scratch
2nd Individual pursuit
2nd Points race
2013
 UEC European Track Championships
2nd Omnium
3rd Team pursuit
 2013–14 UCI Track Cycling World Cup, Manchester
2nd Omnium
 National record, Team pursuit (4:03.033)

See also
 List of Dutch Olympic cyclists

References

External links

1984 births
Living people
Dutch male cyclists
Sportspeople from Amstelveen
Cyclists at the 2008 Summer Olympics
Cyclists at the 2012 Summer Olympics
Cyclists at the 2016 Summer Olympics
Olympic cyclists of the Netherlands
Dutch cyclists at the UCI Track Cycling World Championships
Cyclists from North Holland
21st-century Dutch people